The Office of the Municipal Commissioner was government department in the Canadian province of Manitoba.

Established by the government of John Norquay in 1887, the office was restructured by the Douglas Campbell government as the Ministry of Municipal Affairs in 1953, after taking on increased responsibilities.

The longest-serving Municipal Commissioner was Duncan Lloyd McLeod, who held the position for almost 13 years.

List of Municipal Commissioners in Manitoba

Former Manitoba government departments and agencies